This is a list of United Express destinations by carrier.

Operated by Air Wisconsin

Operated by CommutAir

Operated by GoJet Airlines
GoJet flies to over 80 destinations within the U.S. and Canada, operating both for United Express and Delta Connection. Below are the destinations for its United Express flights, per a 2017 route map.

Operated by Mesa Airlines 
Mesa operates for United Express and American Eagle; below are the United Express destinations (as far as can be discerned from 2016 company route map) – some routes may only be seasonal.

Operated by Republic Airways 
Republic operates for United Express, American Eagle and Delta Connection; below are the United Express destinations

Operated by SkyWest Airlines 
SkyWest operates for United Express, American Eagle, Delta Connection and Alaska SkyWest; below are the United Express destinations.

References

United Airlines
Lists of airline destinations